Van High School is a combined junior and senior high school in Van, West Virginia, USA, serving the southwestern part of Boone County, West Virginia. The school has a rivalry with Scott High School due to the threat of consolidation. When it comes to sports, the rivals are Tug Valley.
 
The school has approximately 116 students by the count of the WVSSAC and various consolidation ideas with Sherman High School and even into a unified county wide school have been floated. The school is placed in class "A" for athletics.

The school colors are blue and gold, and the mascot is the "Bulldog". The school is among the smallest in the state to field an American football team.

Public high schools in West Virginia
Buildings and structures in Boone County, West Virginia
Education in Boone County, West Virginia
Public middle schools in West Virginia